The Afon Ceirig is a small river in Mid Wales. It flows from Esgair Llewelyn in the middle of the Dyfi Hills down to Mathafarn, north-west of Cemmaes Road, where it joins the Afon Dyfi. Between 1763 and around 1840 a water corn mill stood on the river at Bryn Melin, north of Mathafarn.

References

Rivers of Gwynedd
Rivers of Snowdonia